KQBU may refer to:

KQBU (AM), a radio station (920 AM) licensed to El Paso, Texas, United States
KQBU-FM, a radio station (93.3 FM) licensed to Port Arthur, Texas, United States